Norman Wooland (16 March 19053 April 1989) was an English character actor who appeared in many major films, including several Shakespearean adaptations.

Wooland was born in Düsseldorf, Germany to British parents. During the Second World War he was a junior radio announcer, reporting the news for the BBC. His acting break came when he played Horatio in Laurence Olivier's Hamlet (1948), and in which his "fine work" was noted by The New York Times. Then came Catesby in Olivier's film of Richard III, and Paris in Romeo and Juliet (1954). He also had supporting roles in Quo Vadis (1951), Ivanhoe (1952), Background (1953), The Guns of Navarone (1961), Life for Ruth (1962) and International Velvet (1978).

Wooland kept a herd of cows, each of which was named after a Shakespearean character. He died in 1989, aged 84.

Filmography

 The Five Pound Man (1937) as Lodge Keeper
 This England (1941) as (uncredited)
 Escape (1948) as Minister
 Hamlet (1948) as The Royal Court of Denmark - Horatio, his friend
 Look Before You Love (1948) as Ashley Morehouse
 All Over the Town (1949) as Nat Hearn
 Madeleine (1950) as William Minnoch
 The Angel with the Trumpet (1951) as Prince Rudolf
 Quo Vadis (1951) as Nerva
 Ivanhoe (1952) as King Richard
 The Ringer (1952) as Inspector Bliss
 Background (1953) as Bill Ogden
 The Master Plan (1954) as Col. Mark Cleaver
 Romeo and Juliet (1954) as Paris
 Richard III (1955) as Catseby
 Je plaide non coupable (1956) as Pelton
 My Teenage Daughter (1956) as Hugh Manning
 No Road Back (1957) as Insp. Harris 
 The Flesh Is Weak (1957) as Inspector Kingcombe
 The Bandit of Zhobe (1959) as Maj. Crowley
 The Rough and the Smooth (1960) as David Fraser
 Night Train for Inverness (1960) as Roy Lewis
 An Honourable Murder (1960) as Brutus Smith
 The Guns of Navarone (1961) as Group Captain
 Barabbas (1961) as Rufio
 Masters of Venus (1962) as Dr. Ballantyne
 Life for Ruth (1962) as Counsel for the Crown
 The Fall of the Roman Empire (1964) as Virgilianus
 Saul e David (1964) as King Saul
 The Projected Man (1966) as Dr. L. G. Blanchard
 The Fighting Prince of Donegal (1966) as Sir John Perrott
 International Velvet (1978) as Team Doctor
 The Mirror Crack'd (1980) as Medical Examiner (uncredited)

References

External links

1905 births
1989 deaths
BBC newsreaders and journalists
British male film actors
British male Shakespearean actors
20th-century British male actors
People from Staplehurst